The KNTI call letters were granted by the Federal Communications Commission on November 19, 1984.  KNTI is a class B FM signal station (Radio Station Classes defined) and operates on an FM frequency of 99.5 MHz.

KNTI's transmitter is located atop Cow Mountain in Lake County, California

This is one of Lake County and Mendocino County(s) primary radio communications point for radio stations, wireless phone services, emergency services and the Federal Aviation Administration.

References

External links

NTI